Mont Park Asylum was a psychiatric hospital located in Macleod, an outer eastern suburb of Melbourne, Victoria, Australia. The hospital opened in 1912 and closed in the 1990s. Some of the former hospital buildings have since been used by the La Trobe University for administrative purposes.

Use as a hospital 
Mont Park Hospital for the Insane was opened in April 1912. Its proclamation as a Hospital for the Insane was published in the Government Gazette on the 23 October 1912.

First patients admitted to Mont Park were all farm workers and artisans who laid out the farm, roads and gardens. In 1912 at Mont Park there were blacksmiths, workshop employees and 110 carpenters. 212 patients were employed in farming duties and 106 worked in the gardens. Excess produce not required by other asylums was sold. The farm buildings were extensive with hay sheds, store rooms for vegetables, glass houses and pig and calf pens. Only remnants of these buildings remain and are used by La Trobe University as store rooms. These buildings were constructed around a large cobbled basalt courtyard. The largest building was the milking shed, which had a well-laid brick floor, cambered and angled for drainage.

When it opened, Mont Park Hospital was fitted with many facilities far ahead of its time such as a gymnasium, electrical apparatus for physiotherapy and a Red Cross rest room. Patients not working were confined to their wards or in airing cages, which were small and overcrowded. Patients were restrained using straight jackets, skull caps, locked boots or padded cells.

Farming continued for many years until residential development encroached along Plenty Road and people began to complain in newspapers about the smells coming from the hospital grounds from the vicinity of the milking sheds and piggeries.

In 1915 a ward at Mont Park was taken over as a Convalescent Military Hospital. An agreement was made with the Defence Department for the latter to erect the Mont Park central block for use as a Military Hospital. This hospital was generally referred to as the Military Mental Hospital. It was also variously known as the Military Mental Block. Apparently ex-military personnel with chronic psychiatric illness were housed there. The military block at Mont Park was closed in 1924 and handed back to the State for civilian mental cases.

Mont Park also had its own separate hospital for any of the patients' medical and/or surgical needs, called MSU (Medical Surgical Unit). The MSU were staffed by general nurse's who had little to no mental health training, leading to abuse of the patients receiving medical care. 

The hospital was closed in the late-1990s. Mont Park was closely linked with Plenty Valley Repatriation Psychiatric Hospital and Larundel Psychiatric Hospital, which both closed in the late 1990s. These sites were also redeveloped.

The hospital is mentioned by the author Gerald Murnane in his story Stream System.

Subsequent use 
The complex was served by the freight only Mont Park railway branch line.

The vacant land was used for the establishment of La Trobe University in 1967. It is now the site of Springthorpe Housing Development. Part of the old patient hospital is occupied by La Trobe University for administrative offices.

The buildings of Mont Park were used for the 2004 documentary Troubled Minds - The Lithium Revolution which portrayed Dr John Cade's discovery of the use of lithium in mental illness. Several buildings at the former site were also used as filming locations for the Garingal Juvenile Justice Centre in Chris Lilley's mockumentaries Angry Boys and Jonah from Tonga.

See also
 List of Australian psychiatric institutions

References

External links

Hospital buildings completed in 1912
Psychiatric hospitals in Australia
Defunct hospitals in Victoria (Australia)
Hospitals established in 1912
Heritage-listed buildings in Melbourne
Buildings and structures in the City of Darebin
1912 establishments in Australia
1990s disestablishments in Australia
La Trobe University